Oneonta Creek is a river in Otsego County, New York. Oneonta Creek drains out of Wilber Lake, flows through  Oneonta, and empties into the Susquehanna River.

References

Rivers of New York (state)
Rivers of Otsego County, New York